Party of Serb Radicals (SSR), formerly Serbian Radical Party of Montenegro (SRS CG), was a minor far-right and Serbian nationalist political party, active in Montenegro.

History
The SSR was formed by the former members of Serbian Radical Party, after it ceased its activity in Montenegro. The SSR was part of the New Serb Democracy. Following the return of party leader convicted war criminal Vojislav Šešelj from his trial for war crimes at the ICTY in The Hague, the SSR merged back into the Serbian Radical Party which renewed its activity in Montenegro.

Electoral results

See also
Serbian Radical Party
Serbian nationalism

References

Eurosceptic parties in Montenegro
Political parties with year of disestablishment missing
Political parties with year of establishment missing
Right-wing populism in Montenegro
Serb nationalist parties
Serb political parties in Montenegro
Serbian Radical Party
Social conservative parties
Far-right political parties